Tezaab is a 1988 Indian Hindi-language action romance film starring Anil Kapoor and Madhuri Dixit in lead roles. The film gave Dixit her first big break, making her an overnight star. in addition to reaffirming Kapoor's star status, after a successful Mr. India (1987). The film was produced and directed by N. Chandra. The music was composed by Laxmikant–Pyarelal. 

Tezaab released on 11 November 1988, and proved to be a major commercial success at the box office, becoming the highest-grossing film of the year. It ran in theatres for more than 50 weeks, becoming a golden jubilee success. With Tezaab, N. Chandra scored a box office hat-trick with his previous hits Ankush (1986) and Pratighaat (1987). The film is also popular for the song "Ek Do Teen", which was a chartbusting success. It received positive reviews from critics upon release, with praise for its story, screenplay, dialogues, soundtrack, and performances of the cast.

At the 34th Filmfare Awards, Tezaab received a leading 12 nominations, Best Film, Best Director (Chandra), Best Actress (Dixit) and Best Supporting Actor (Pandey), and won 4 awards, including  Best Actor (Kapoor), Best Female Playback Singer (Alka Yagnik) and Best Choreography (Saroj Khan), the latter two for the song "Ek Do Teen". At the ceremony, Kapoor scored his first Best Actor win, while Dixit garnered her first-ever Best Actress nomination.

The film was remade in Telugu as Two Town Rowdy, with Daggubati Venkatesh and in Tamil Rojavai Killathe, with Arjun. The core storyline is loosely based on the 1984 film Streets of Fire.

Plot
When Inspector Singh (Suresh Oberoi) learns that Munna (Anil Kapoor) is about to reach his region of jurisdiction, he checks Munna's record. Munna is identified by Inspector Singh as Cadet Mahesh Deshmukh, a talented Cadet he first met at the scene of a Nasik bank robbery a few years prior, where Mahesh's parents and numerous other bank employees had been brutally murdered by a gang of thieves. 

Following the bank incident, Inspector Singh finds Munna, rekindles their connection, and inquires as to his whereabouts. Munna/Mahesh responds by saying:

With his sister Jyoti, he had relocated to Bombay, where they had met Mohini, a poor and miserable woman who was compelled to dance in order to support her father Shyamlal (Anupam Kher). Because she earned money for him by dancing in adjacent nightclubs, he is a drunk who does not want to marry Mohini off. He acted similarly against his wife (Suhas Joshi), and when she disobeyed him, he attacked her with acid. After that, Mohini's mother killed herself.

In his youth, Shyamlal had taken a huge loan from Lotiya Pathan (a dreaded gangster) and the only way to repay it was to make Mohini dance. Shyamlal also has to deal with Chote Khan, the younger brother of Lotiya, who was involved in the Bank robbery and had killed Mahesh/Munna's parents, and also Chote Khan was arrested due to Mahesh/Munna.

After release/bailout, immediately Chote Khan had attempted to rape Jyoti, but Mahesh killed Chote Khan in self-defense. For this,  Mahesh/Munna was arrested and sentenced to one year in jail, after which he changed his name to Munna.

On learning the whole story from  Mahesh/Munna, Inspector Singh allows him to complete his task and stipulates some conditions, including the time and date of return/surrender.

When Lotiya hears that Mahesh/Munna is back in town, he kidnaps Mohini. Shyamlal now approaches/begs Munna to get Mohini rescued ASAP and requires that she be returned to him only. Mahesh rescues Mohini, and they rejoice to see each other again after a long time, but Mahesh asks Mohini to return to her father; Mohini becomes sad again as she had expected to follow with her lover.

As he had promised Inspector Singh, Munna surrenders whereupon he is tried and tested in Court and then sent to prison for some time.

After a retrial, Munna is acquitted of his charges and plans to start afresh in another city – Goa. However, his sister Jyoti convinces Mahesh/ Munna not to forget his lover Mohini – so Mahesh/Munna sends his friends- Guldasta and Baban – to explain to Mohini where her lover is now.

The evil father, Shyamlal, overhears Mohini's plans to escape and is enraged, and he tries to stop Mohini from leaving. Guldasta and Shyamlal have a fight in which both die, but Mohini manages to escape safely, and Mohini meets Munna again.

However, Lotiya, learning of Munna's acquittal, conspires to kill him as revenge for his brother's death – so they all meet up at a dockyard. Baban (Chunky Pandey) gets a tip of Lotiya's conspiracy and challenges Lotiya. Lotiya gets enraged, and a fight between him and Baban ends in Lotiya getting defeated. Baban wants to kill Lotiya in the fit of rage, but Munna intercepts him and stops him from committing murder.

Meanwhile, Lotiya regains his strength and goes to attack Munna with a club. Baban dies, deflecting the attack. Munna fights back at Lotiya and is about to kill him, but Inspector Singh interrupts just in time to stop him from taking the law into his hands. Inspector Singh recognizes he's breaking the law but allows Munna to fight Lotiya as he sees this as a way of Munna letting go of his anger and hatred he holds within himself. As Munna defeats Lotiya, Lotiya quickly gets up and tries to attack and kill Munna, but Inspector Singh kills him with his service pistol, and justice is served finally.
 Alternate ending
Baban does not die here; excluding this fact, the rest of the ending is exactly like the original.

Cast
 Anil Kapoor as Mahesh "Munna" Deshmukh
 Madhuri Dixit as Mohini Dhanyekar
 Anupam Kher as Shyamlal Dhanyekar, Mohini's father
 Chunky Pandey as Sushim "Baban" Choudhry, Munna's friend
 Suparna Anand as Jyoti Deshmukh, Munna's younger sister
 Kiran Kumar as Lotiya Pathan
 Annu Kapoor as Abbas Ali / Guldasta
 Suresh Oberoi as Inspector Gagan Singh
 Tej Sapru as Rantej Saxena
 Johnny Lever as Kainchee Singh, Munna's friend
 Mahavir Shah as Inspector Tarachand Gupta
 Salman Khan as Rookki
 Jack Gaud as Mukut Bihari
 Dinesh Hingoo as Marwadi Seth
 Achyut Potdar as Namrish Deshmukh, Munna's father
 Vijay Patkar as Chiraunji Surwadhre, Munna's friend
 Jaywant Wadkar as Aman Pratap Ahuja, Munna's friend
 Mandakini as Nikita Sharma (Cameo appearance)
 Suhas Joshi as Sumira Dhanyekar, Mohini's mother (Cameo appearance)
 Ravi Patwardhan as Lawyer, Public Prosecutor

Soundtrack
The song Ek Do Teen was inspired by the opening bars of an old popular song "Chanda Mama Door Ke" composed by the famous yesteryears music composer Ravi for the film Vachan (1955). The film's soundtrack album sold more than 8million units, becoming the second best-selling Bollywood music album of 1988, behind only Qayamat Se Qayamat Tak.

Ek Do Teen was subsequently recreated for another movie Baaghi 2, sung this time by Shreya Ghoshal.

So Gaya Yeh Jahan also remade for another film. In 2013, this song was remade for Nautanki Saala! sung by Nitin Mukesh with composer Laxmikant–Pyarelal. On 2019, this song remade again for movie Bypass Road, sung by Nitin Mukesh featuring Jubin Nautiyal and Saloni Thakkar with composer Raaj Aashoo.

Awards
34th Filmfare Awards:
Won
 Best Actor – Anil Kapoor
 Best Female Playback Singer – Alka Yagnik for "Ek Do Teen"
 Best Choreography – Saroj Khan for "Ek Do Teen"
 Best Dialogue – Kamlesh Pandey

 Nominated
 Best Film – N. Chandra
 Best Director – N. Chandra
 Best Actress – Madhuri Dixit
 Best Supporting Actor – Chunkey Pandey
 Best Music Director – Laxmikant–Pyarelal
 Best Lyricist – Javed Akhtar for "Ek Do Teen"
 Best Male Playback Singer – Amit Kumar for "Ek Do Teen"
 Best Female Playback Singer – Anuradha Paudwal for "Keh Do Ke Tum"

References

External links
 

1988 films
1980s Hindi-language films
1980s crime action films
Indian crime action films
Indian action thriller films
Indian romantic musical films
Indian romantic thriller films
Indian crime thriller films
Indian vigilante films
Indian nonlinear narrative films
1980s romantic musical films
1988 action thriller films
1980s romantic thriller films
1980s crime thriller films
Films directed by N. Chandra
Films scored by Laxmikant–Pyarelal
Indian remakes of American films
Hindi films remade in other languages
Films set in Maharashtra
Films set in Mumbai
Films shot in Maharashtra
Films shot in Mumbai
Indian romantic action films
1980s masala films
1980s romantic action films
1980s vigilante films